Koop Islands  is the third studio album by the Stockholm-based electronic music duo Koop. Compared to their last success Waltz for Koop, Koop Islands combines inspiration by 1930's swing with an exotic Caribbean touch. Collaborators include Yukimi Nagano (of Little Dragon), Ane Brun, Rob Gallagher, and others.

Track listing
 "Koop Island Blues "  – 4:34 
 "Come to Me"  – 2:51
 "Forces....Darling"  – 5:03
 "I See a Different You"  – 3:16
 "Let's Elope"  – 3:14
 "The Moonbounce"  – 2:46
 "Beyond the Son"  – 4:53
 "Whenever There Is You"  – 4:01
 "Drum Rhythm A (Music for Ballet Exercises)" – 2:14

Some editions include a bonus track: "I See a Different You (Marcus Enochson Remix)"

In popular culture
 "Koop Island Blues" can be heard in the Season 1 Episode 7 of Intergalactic
 "Koop Island Blues" can be heard in the 2009 video game, The Saboteur
 "Koop Island Blues" was used in a routine by Mia Michaels for Evan Kasprzak and Randi Evans during the fifth season of So You Think You Can Dance.
 "Koop Island Blues" can be heard in the background of the 6th cinematic clip in the game World in Conflict.
 "Koop Island Blues" can also be heard in the twenty-fifth episode of season two of 90210.
 "Koop Island Blues" can also be heard in the fifth episode of season one of Breaking Bad.
 "Koop Island Blues" can also be heard in the twelfth episode of the fifth season  of The L Word.
 "Koop Island Blues" can also be heard in the movie Patong Girl (2014).
 "Koop Island Blues" (French version) can also be heard in the movie Bravo Virtuoso (2017), an Armenian-French-Belgian black comedy by Levon Minasian.
 "Koop Island Blues" can also be heard in the movie A Hairy Tale (2019).

Credits
 Bass [Walking] – Dan Berglund (tracks: 2 3)
 Double bass – Martin Höper (tracks: 1 4 5 6 8)
 Percussion – Ola Bothzén (tracks: 5 6 7)
 Vibraphone – Mattias Ståhl (tracks: 3 4 7)
 Vocals – Ane Brun (track: 1), Yukimi Nagano (tracks: 2 4 8)

Certifications
The album was awarded a silver certification from the Independent Music Companies Association which indicated sales of at least 30,000 copies throughout Europe.

References

External links
Koop Islands at Discogs

2006 albums
Koop (band) albums